The Order of the Crown is an order established in Monaco on 20 July 1960. This decoration is awarded to people, who have done something exceptional or by their exceptional conduct.

Award 
It is awarded to people with high merit by the Grand-Master, currently Albert II, Prince of Monaco.

Reception 
According to the statutes, and except for Members of the Princely Family and foreigners, one can only receive the Order first with the rank of Knight. To be awarded the following higher ranks, one must hold the lower rank for a set number of years.  To be promoted to Officer, one must serve four years as a knight, promotion from Officer to Commander is three years, Commander to Grand Officer is four years, and finally promotion from Grand Officer to Grand Cross requires a period of five years.

Nominations to the order belong to the Grand-Master. The Chancellor proposes promotions. According to the Prince's orders, the Chancellor proposes the projects of nomination and promotion ordonnances. The grantees must be received in the Order before wearing the decorations. The Grand-Master receives the Grand Crosses, Grand Officers and Commanders. The Chancellor receives the Officers and Knights. The exception being that foreigners will be admitted in the Order, but not received.

Military honors 
Members of the Order who are wearing their decorations are entitled to receive military honours from the Compagnie des Carabiniers du Prince.  Officers and Knights are honoured by the execution of the command "Port, ARMS" (Portez, Armes).   For Grand Crosses, Grand Officers and Commanders, they are honoured by the execution of the command "Present, ARMS" (Présentez, Armes).

Grades 
The order is composed of five grades:
 Grand Cross. Badge hanging from the sash worn from the right shoulder to the left hip and breast star on the left chest.
 Grand Officer. Badge hanging from a necklet and breast star on the left chest
 Commander. Badge hanging from a necklet
 Officer. Badge hanging from a ribbon with rosette
 Knight. Badge hanging from a ribbon

Insignia 
The badge of the order is a cross pattée with fluted arms of silver and a central gold stripe.  Between each set of arms of the cross is the monogram of the order's founder Rainier III, in gold.  The medallion in the center of the cross bears a prince's crown.  On the reverse of the badge the medallion bears the lozengy arms of Monaco and the House of Grimaldi.  The badge is mounted by an oak and laurel wreath.

The star of the order is identical to the badge, but lacks the wreath for mounting.  Additionally, the center medallion is surrounded by a ring of lozenges.

The ribbon of the order is olive green with a central red stripe.

Recipients
 Princess Benedikte of Denmark
 Princess Charlotte, Duchess of Valentinois

Grand Masters
 Albert II, Prince of Monaco
 Rainier III, Prince of Monaco

References

External links
 The statutes of the Order of Saint-Charles (text of the ordonnance in French) are used for the Order of the Crown, with "Chancellor of the Order of the Crown" instead of "Chancellor of the Order of Saint-Charles" where needed.

Crown (Monaco), Order of the
Awards established in 1960